Sir Kingsmill James Key, 4th Baronet (11 October 1864 – 9 August 1932) was an English cricketer.

Life and career
Key was born in Streatham Common, London. He was educated at Clifton College and Oriel College, Oxford. In the course of a long career he played for, among others, Surrey County Cricket Club (whom he captained for several years in the 1890s), Oxford University, Marylebone Cricket Club (MCC) and the Gentlemen. His highest score of 281, for Oxford against Middlesex at Chiswick Park in 1887, remained the highest first-class score for the university until 2013.

Key married Helen Abercrombie in Baguley, Cheshire, in 1888. They lived in London, where Key was a stockbroker, a member of the London Stock Exchange. He died at the age of 67 in Wittersham, Kent, having contracted blood poisoning after an insect bite. His cousin, Leslie Gay, played one Test match for England. Leslie's sister, Charlotte Evelyn Gay, was an English social and temperance reformer affiliated with the Church Army.

References

External links
 

1864 births
1932 deaths
People educated at Clifton College
Alumni of Oriel College, Oxford
Cricketers from Greater London
English cricketers
Surrey cricketers
Surrey cricket captains
Oxford University cricketers
Gentlemen cricketers
North v South cricketers
Deaths due to insect bites and stings
Gentlemen of the South cricketers
Marylebone Cricket Club cricketers
Gentlemen of England cricketers
Baronets in the Baronetage of the United Kingdom
H. D. G. Leveson Gower's XI cricketers
Lord Hawke's XI cricketers
Oxford University Authentics cricketers
A. J. Webbe's XI cricketers
E. J. Sanders' XI cricketers